Yuliya Gennadyevna Maltseva (born 30 November 1990) is a Russian track and field athlete whose speciality is the discus throw. She competed at the 2015 World Championships in Beijing without qualifying for the final. She also won the gold medal at the 2015 Summer Universiade.

Her personal best in the event is 63.48 metres set in Montreuil-sous-Bois in 2015.

Competition record

References

External links

1990 births
Living people
Place of birth missing (living people)
Russian female discus throwers
Universiade gold medalists in athletics (track and field)
Universiade gold medalists for Russia
Medalists at the 2015 Summer Universiade
World Athletics Championships athletes for Russia
Russian Athletics Championships winners